Cahit Sıtkı Tarancı (born Hüseyin Cahit; October 4, 1910 – October 13, 1956) was a Turkish poet and author.

Biography
Tarancı belonged to a well known clan family of Diyarbekir (present day: Diyarbakır) like his father Pirinççizâde Bekir Sıdkı and his uncle Pirinççizâde Aziz Feyzi.

Tarancı finished his secondary education in St. Joseph High School, then graduated from Galatasaray High School in Istanbul. After Tarancı finished high school, he continued his education in the School of Political Sciences in Istanbul between the years 1931 and 1935. Then he left for Paris, to study in the Institut d'Études Politiques de Paris, but he had to return to Turkey without completing his education in the wake of World War II in 1940.

From 1944 on, he worked as a translator in the state-owned news agency Anadolu Ajansı, the Turkish Grain Board (TMO) and the Ministry of Labor.

In 1951, he married Cavidan Tınaz. Following a severe illness in 1954, he became paralyzed. As the treatment of his health problem did not succeed in Turkey, he was taken to Vienna, Austria. He died on October 13, 1956 in a hospital there. His body was brought to Turkey and was laid to rest at the Cebeci Asri Cemetery in Ankara.

Bibliography
Poetry
 Ömrümde Sükut (1933)
 Otuz Beş Yaş (1946)
 Düşten Güzel (1952)
 Sonrası (1957)

Prose
 Ziya'ya Mektuplar (1957)

See also
 List of contemporary Turkish poets

References

External links
Şiirleri - Poems
 Cahit Sıtkı Tarancı - On his life and poetry

1910 births
1956 deaths
Turkish poets
Galatasaray High School alumni
People from Diyarbakır
Burials at Cebeci Asri Cemetery
20th-century poets
St. Joseph High School Istanbul alumni